Thubelihle Thabo Sithole (born 10 June 1995) is a South African basketball player for Cape Town Tigers and the South Africa national basketball team.

Early life
Born in KwaZulu-Natal, Sithole attended Durban High School and started playing basketball seriously at age 8.

Professional career
In December 2015, Sithole signed with Žalgiris, as a result of head coach Darius Dimavičius's visit to South Africa.
Sithole started his professional career in Lithuania with Žalgiris-2 in the second-tier National Basketball League (NKL).

In 2018, he signed in South Africa with the Kwazulu Marlins of the Basketball National League (BNL).

In October 2019, Sithole played with the Jozi Nuggets in the 2021 BAL qualifiers.
Since 2021, Sithole is on the roster of the Cape Town Tigers.

National team career
Sithole has played for the South Africa national basketball team. He played with the team at AfroBasket 2017. He had also played for the country's Under-16 team before.

Personal
Sithole has been in a Master program of Development Science at the University of KwaZulu-Natal.

References

External links

1995 births
Living people
BC Žalgiris-2 players
Cape Town Tigers players
Jozi Nuggets players
Point guards
South African basketball players